Heper is a Turkish surname. Notable people with the surname include:

 Fethi Heper (born 1944), Turkish footballer and finance professor
 Sadettin Heper (1899–1980), Turkish musician and composer of Mevlevi music and Ottoman classical music

Turkish-language surnames